The Taiwan Sugar Railways is a  industrial railway operated by the Taiwan Sugar Corporation. The railway was primarily used in the production of sugar by transporting sugarcane to mills, but some lines also provided passenger service. 

At its height, the Sugar Railways had an extensive network spanning  of track, but since the Kuomintang's takeover of Taiwan in 1949, most of the infrastructure has been abolished and removed. The only line still used to carry sugarcane today is the Magongcuo Line in Huwei, Yunlin, though many other lines are preserved as heritage railways.

History

The Sugar Railways were initially constructed by Meiji Sugar Co., Ltd. during Japanese rule in the early 20th century and continued to operate well into the 1990s under the management of the Taiwan Sugar Corporation. During its peak, the Sugar Railways included over 3000 km of track though by 2003 only 240 km remained. Regular passenger service was discontinued in 1982 as the need for train service to rural areas dwindled with the increasing urbanization of Taiwan and the dominance of highways. More lines were closed in the 1990s as the importance of the sugar industry decreased. Generally the remaining lines are only in operation during the sugarcane harvest season. With domestic sugarcane production dwindling in recent years, rail operations have been sporadic. Some short distance train services resumed in 2003, now mostly catering to tourists and residents wishing to relive childhood memories.

Operations
Typically, most of the Sugar Railway lines centered on the many sugar mills in southern and central Taiwan, radiating outwards through sugarcane fields and small towns. Most of the lines were also linked with stations shared with the main railway lines allowing passengers to transfer to long distance trains. Trains carrying sugarcane and passengers ran along the Sugar Railway lines at relatively slow speeds of roughly 10 km/h. Locomotives were initially steam powered, but by the late 1970s the railway had converted to small diesel locomotives.

See also
Rail transport in Taiwan
Transportation in Taiwan

References

External links

Taiwan Sugar Corporation (English)
Sugar railways in Taiwan

Former buildings and structures in Taiwan
History of sugar
Sugar mill railways
2 ft 6 in gauge railways in Taiwan